Héctor Joaquín Varela (born 25 March 1997) is an Argentine professional footballer who plays as a defender for San Antonio FC on loan from San Martín de Tucumán.

Career
Varela played for Villa Cubas de Catamarca to start his youth career in 2006, though was signed by San Lorenzo soon after. Two years later, Varela was selected for Proyecto Crecer; a project partly supported by Bordeaux. Varela then joined Newell's Old Boys in 2014. He made his senior debut on 10 December 2017 during a loss away to Rosario Central, which preceded Varela scoring his first goal versus Arsenal de Sarandí on 27 February 2018; a 92nd-minute winner in a 2–1 home victory. He made nine further appearances, whilst netting another goal in April against Atlético Tucumán; which was also scored in additional time.

On 2 August 2018, fellow Argentine Primera División side Godoy Cruz signed Varela. His first appearance came against his former employers on 27 August.

Career statistics
.

References

External links

1997 births
Living people
People from Catamarca Province
Argentine footballers
Association football defenders
Argentine Primera División players
Newell's Old Boys footballers
Godoy Cruz Antonio Tomba footballers
San Martín de Tucumán footballers
San Antonio FC players